Little Blue Peak is highest point on Little Blue Ridge in the Northern Coast Ranges, located on the boundary of Yolo and Lake counties in northern California.

It is within Berryessa Snow Mountain National Monument.   Some snow falls on this peak during the winter.

History
Despite its relatively low elevation, the officially unnamed summit is the highest point in Yolo County.  Little Blue Peak didn't always have that distinction, formerly Berryessa Peak  was considered to be the Yolo County highpoint. in 1991 John Sarna discovered that this summit is over  higher than Berryessa's, therefore the county's highest.

See also
Lake Berryessa

References

External links 
 

Mountains of Lake County, California
Mountains of Yolo County, California
California Coast Ranges
Protected areas of Yolo County, California
Mountains of Northern California